The 2017–18 season was Crewe Alexandra's 141st season in their history, their 94th in the English Football League and second consecutive in League Two. Along with competing in League Two, the club participated in the FA Cup, EFL Cup and EFL Trophy.

The season covers the period from 1 July 2017 to 30 June 2018

Competitions

Friendlies
As of 5 June 2017, Crewe Alexandra have announced seven pre-season friendlies against Stoke City, Macclesfield Town, Buxton, Barrow, Alsager Town, Bury, Kidsgrove Athletic.

League Two

League table

Result summary

Results by matchday

Matches
On 21 June 2017, the league fixtures were announced.

FA Cup
On 16 October 2017, Crewe Alexandra were drawn at home to Rotherham United in the first round. In the second round Alex were given an away tie against Blackburn Rovers.

EFL Cup
On 16 June 2017, Crewe Alexandra were drawn at home to Bolton Wanderers in the first round.

EFL Trophy
On 12 July 2017, Crewe Alexandra were drawn against Newcastle United U23s, Oldham Athletic and Port Vale in Northern Group D.

Transfers

Transfers in

Transfers out

Loans in

Loans out

References

Crewe Alexandra
Crewe Alexandra F.C. seasons